Ian Halpin (born 20 April 1993) is an Australian sprinter.

On 10 March 2019, he established his personal best in 400 m to 46.39.

He won two gold medals at the 2019 Oceania Athletics Championships in Townsville.

References

External links
IAAF

Australian male sprinters
1993 births
Living people